Schinia sordida, the sordid flower moth or dingy schinia, is a moth of the family Noctuidae. The species was first described by John B. Smith in 1883. It is found in the United States from North Carolina to central Florida west to Kansas and Texas. It has also been recorded from Alabama.

The wingspan is 16–20 mm. There is one generation per year.

The larvae feed on Pityopsis pinifolia and Haplopappus divaricatus.

References

Schinia
Moths of North America
Moths described in 1883